Notes on a Dream is an album by Jordan Rudess. It was released on June 2, 2009.

The majority of this album contains classical piano renditions of Dream Theater songs. Rudess's arrangements include many sections that were not in the original songs, especially solos. Tracks 3, 7, and 11 are original pieces.

Track listing

Personnel
 Jordan Rudess - piano

External links
 Notes on a Dream at JordanRudess.bandcamp.com

2009 albums
Jordan Rudess albums